Diachrysia zosimi is a species of moth of the family Noctuidae. It is found in Eastern Europe and bordering regions, such as Poland, Northern Italy, Bulgaria, Ukraine, and Southern Siberia.

Description
The wingspan is 32–42 mm. 
Warren (1914) states P. zosimi Hbn. (64 e). Forewing glossy green, the costal and terminal areas narrowly brownish; a diffuse brown costal triangle containing the 3 dark-edged stigmata; a dark somewhat hook shaped mark on inner margin represents the outer lower portion of basal patch: the bright green area is limited outwardly by a widely outcurved outer line, which is preceded on inner margin by a dark triangular mark, and followed by a small dark blotch at anal angle; hindwing shining pale fuscous, with darker outer line and terminal border separated by a paler band. A local species found in Piedmont, Galicia, the Dobrulscha, and the Ural Mts.; also in the Altai Mts., W. Siberia, in Amurland, and Japan.

Biology
Adults fly from June to August in two generations and sometimes also from September to October in a third generation.

The larvae feed on Sanguisorba species, such as Sanguisorba officinalis and sometimes Parnassia palustris.

References

External links

Diachrysia on Funet
Fauna Europaea
www.lepiforum.de

Plusiinae
Moths of Japan
Moths of Europe
Moths described in 1822
Taxa named by Jacob Hübner